"Little Things" is a song co-written and recorded by American country music artist Marty Stuart.  It was released in January 1991 as the first single from the album Tempted.  The song reached #8 on the Billboard Hot Country Singles & Tracks chart.  It was written by Stuart and Paul Kennerley.

Chart performance

Year-end charts

References

1991 singles
Marty Stuart songs
Songs written by Paul Kennerley
Song recordings produced by Tony Brown (record producer)
Songs written by Marty Stuart
MCA Records singles
1991 songs